Kasos Island Public Airport  is an airport in Kasos, Greece.

Airlines and destinations
The following airlines operate regular scheduled and charter flights at Kasos Island Airport:

Statistics

See also
Transport in Greece

References

External links

Airports in Greece
Dodecanese
Buildings and structures in the South Aegean